Jan Merlin (born Jan Wasylewski, April 3, 1925 – September 20, 2019) was an American character actor, television writer, and author.

Early years
Born Jan Wasylewski and reared in New York City, Merlin was of Polish ancestry. He attended the Grace Church School for Boys before dropping out to join the Navy. He later graduated from the Neighborhood Playhouse School of the Theatre.

During World War II, he enlisted in the United States Navy and became a torpedoman.

Career 
After Merlin's discharge, he worked in summer stock beginning in 1946, and then enrolled in the Neighborhood Playhouse School of the Theater, making his Broadway debut in 1949 in Mister Roberts starring Henry Fonda.

His professional acting career, which spanned more than five decades, included performances in stage plays on and off Broadway, radio dramas, live and filmed episodes of television series, and more than 30 feature motion pictures. His most recent performances were in live radio dramas broadcast in June 2010. In his film and television work, Merlin was frequently cast as the heavy, and consequently his character very often died onscreen. An early role for him was in the 1956 western playing Billy a small town boy getting mixed up with a gunfighter that dropped in the town in A Day of Fury. In 1960, Merlin played Travers in Hell Bent for Leather, and his other film credits include roles in Guns of Diablo (1965), The St. Valentine's Day Massacre (1967), Take the Money and Run (1969), The Twilight People (1972), I Escaped from Devil's Island (1973), The Slams (1973), The Hindenburg (1975) and Time Trackers (1989).

Merlin had co-starring roles in two television series: from 1950 to 1953 as Cadet Roger Manning in Tom Corbett, Space Cadet, and in 1959 as Lieutenant Colin Kirby in the ABC western series The Rough Riders. In 1958, he played Kenneth on the NBC drama Kitty Foyle.

In 1960, he was cast as Mick Norton in the episode "Hostage Island" of the ABC adventure series The Islanders, set in the South Pacific.

Also in 1960 he again died on the screen in S3E10  of Gene Berry's TV Western series Bat Masterson, playing a wild gun slinging cowboy, the troubled son of a deceased war hero whose mother left him when he was a child, in the episode "Last Stop To Austin".

He also appeared as Hendry Grant in the 1961 episode "First Blood" of the NBC western series The Tall Man. He made two guest appearances on Perry Mason: in 1958, as Tony Davis in "The Case of the Black-Eyed Blonde", and in 1961 as Ralph Quentin in "The Case of the Jealous Journalist."   Merlin appeared in a 1954 episode of Dragnet "The Big Rod", cast as Gregory Moore, a felony hit and run suspect.  Merlin played a villain in three episodes of Voyage to the Bottom of the Sea: "No Way Out", "The X Factor" and "Death From The Past". In 1957, he appeared in Season 1 Episode 21 of Dick Powell's Zane Grey Theatre opposite Ernest Borgnine, also a former US Navy man. In 1962, he was cast as Bill Enders in the episode "The Ride" of the NBC western series Bonanza. In 1966, he co-starred in the Combat! Season 4 episode "One at a Time" as a German sniper, Sgt. Erich and again in 1966 in the season 5 episode "Headcount" as Lt. Geiben.

Merlin received a Daytime Emmy Award in 1975 for Outstanding Writing for a Daytime Drama Series as part of the NBC Daytime soap opera Another World. He was nominated again in 1976. His first novel was published in 1982. He currently has a number of novels in print, including Gunbearer, Part I, Gunbearer, Part II, Ainoko, Gypsies Don't Lie, Crackpots, and Shooting Montezuma. He has also self-published several works of fiction and non-fiction with co-author William Russo, including The Paid Companion of J. Wilkes Booth, Troubles in a Golden Eye, MGM Makes Boys' Town, Hanging with Billy Budd, and Frankie Thomas: the Eternal Cadet.

He also appeared in Little House on the Prairie as Olga Nordstrom's Father, Jon Nordstrom. Season 1 episode 8 1974.

Personal life & death 

Merlin married his first wife Patricia Datz in 1951. They had a son, Peter William Merlin (born 1964). Patricia died in 1986. 
Two years after his wife's death, Merlin married his second wife Barbara Doyle, and remained married until his death on September 20, 2019. He was 94.

Filmography

References

External links 
 
 Brief biography of Jan Merlin
 Autobiographical account by Jan Merlin

1925 births
2019 deaths
American male film actors
American male television actors
United States Navy personnel of World War II
American people of Polish descent
American soap opera writers
Male actors from Los Angeles
Male actors from New York City
American male television writers
Military personnel from New York City
Neighborhood Playhouse School of the Theatre alumni
Screenwriters from California
Screenwriters from New York (state)
Stuyvesant High School alumni
United States Navy sailors